Sergi Bruguera became the 3-time tournament winner by defeating Guy Forget 3–6, 7–5, 6–2, 6–1 in the final.

Seeds

Draw

Finals

Top half

Bottom half

References

External links
 Official results archive (ATP)
 Official results archive (ITF)

Swiss Open (tennis)
Singles